Cagraray is an island located in the province of Albay in the Philippines. Except barangays San Antonio and Salvacion which belongs to Malilipot, the other barangays of Cagraray belong to the municipality of Bacacay, Albay.

The island is sandwiched between San Miguel and Batan islands, and is home to Misibis Bay, a luxury resort.

Transportation
A bridge spanning the narrowest portion of the Sula Channel connects the island to mainland Luzon. Access to the island is also available from its principal towns of Malilipot and Bacacay and from Tabaco City.

External links
 

Islands of Albay
Tourist attractions in Albay
Beaches of the Philippines